The Dadou is a  long river in the Tarn department in southern France. Its source is near Saint-Salvi-de-Carcavès. It flows generally west. It is a right tributary of the Agout, into which it flows near Ambres.

Communes along its course
The Dadou flows west, crossing the Tarn department, through the following communes, ordered from source to mouth: Saint-Salvi-de-Carcavès, Le Masnau-Massuguiès, Lacaze, Paulinet, Rayssac, Mont-Roc, Teillet, Le Travet, Arifat, Saint-Antonin-de-Lacalm, Montredon-Labessonnié, Saint-Lieux-Lafenasse, Vénès, Réalmont, Saint-Genest-de-Contest, Lombers, Laboutarie, Montdragon, Saint-Julien-du-Puy, Graulhet, Briatexte, Saint-Gauzens, Puybegon, Giroussens, Ambres

References

Rivers of France
Rivers of Occitania (administrative region)
Rivers of Tarn (department)